Caboonbah is a rural locality in the Somerset Region, Queensland, Australia.

Geography
The locality is bounded to the south by Lake Wivenhoe and to the east and north by the Brisbane River.

The Esk Kilcoy Road passes through the locality, entering from the south-west (Coal Creek) and exiting to the north-east (the locality of Lake Wivenhoe).

History 
The locality name derives from the Caboonbah Homestead built by Henry Plantagenet Somerset. The name derives from the Kabi language "cabon gibbah" meaning  big rock.

Caboonbah Homestead was built in 1889-90 for grazier Henry Plantagenet Somerset and his wife Katherine Rose (née McConnel) and their family.  It was added to the Queensland Heritage Register on 12 December 1996. It was destroyed by fire in 2009 and removed from the Queensland Heritage Register in 2014. Caboonbah Homestead was on Esk-Kilcoy Road, now with the neighbouring locality of Lake Wivenhoe.

Caboonbah Undenominational Church is a union church. It was established by Henry Plantagenet Somerset and takes its name, "Caboonbah", from the Somerset family homestead, Caboonbah Homestead, nearby. The wooden structure was designed by Somerset's wife Katherine Rose Somerset, the daughter of David Cannon McConnell and Mary McConnel (nee McLeod) who founded the Cressbrook Homestead. The church was built by Lars Andersen. It opened in 1905 to serve the local farming community. It is located on Cressbrook-Caboonbah Road, now within the neighbouring locality of Mount Beppo.

Education 
There are no schools in Caboonbah. The nearest government primary and secondary schools are Toogoolawah State School and Toogoolawah State High School respectively, both in Toogoolawah to the north-west.

References 

Suburbs of Somerset Region
Localities in Queensland